Pulkovo Aviation Enterprise Flight 612 was a scheduled passenger flight operated by Saint Petersburg-based airline Pulkovo Aviation Enterprise, flying from Anapa Airport to Pulkovo Airport in Saint Petersburg. The aircraft crashed in Donetsk Oblast in eastern Ukraine, near the Russian border, on 22 August 2006. All 170 people on board were killed.

The crash was the deadliest aviation accident in 2006. At the time it was the deadliest crash in modern Ukrainian history and the second deadliest in Ukraine SSR, after the 1979 Dniprodzerzhynsk mid-air collision.

Aircraft 
Pulkovo Aviation Enterprise Flight 612 was served by a Russian Tupolev Tu-154M airliner (registration: RA-85185). The aircraft did not refuel in Anapa and departed on time. "The Pulkovo Airlines flight departed Anapa as scheduled. All necessary maintenance was performed as required before departure," said Oleg Tolstyh, General Director of Anapa's Vityazevo Airport. The aircraft was manufactured in 1992 and had been in service for approximately 25,000 flight hours. It had first flown in China until Pulkovo Aviation Enterprise acquired it in 2001.

The captain of the aircraft, 49-year-old Ivan Ivanovich Korogodin (referred to as "Vanya" on the CVR recording), had 12,312 hours of flying experience, 5,956 of which were as a pilot of a Tu-154. The first officer, 59-year-old Vladimir Vladimirovich Onishchenko, had 11,876 flight hours, including 2,200 hours on the Tu-154. 23-year-old Andrei Nikolaevich Khodnevich, a trainee pilot, was also on board the aircraft and had only 189 flight hours, with 88 of them on the Tu-154. The navigator, 36-year-old Igor Yurievich Levchenko, had 7,848 hours, 5,596 of them on the Tu-154. The flight engineer, 51-year-old Viktor Petrovich Makarov, had 9,064 flight hours, including 6,701 hours on the Tu-154.

Crash
On Tuesday, 22 August 2006, at 15:04 (Moscow Time), a Tu-154 airliner of Saint Petersburg-based Pulkovo Airlines took off from Anapa Airport in Russia for Pulkovo Airport in Saint Petersburg.

Half an hour later, there were thunderstorms in the vicinity of the flight, and the aircraft entered an area of severe turbulence. Just before 15:35, they reported to ATC reaching FL 390.

At 15:35:02, the crew disengaged the autopilot. Almost immediately, the stall warning sounded and then the flight's angle of attack increased to 46 degrees while its forward airspeed dropped to zero. The flight sent an SOS signal and disappeared from radar contact. It entered a deep stall from which the crew could not recover. Two of the three engines flamed out, and the crew was communicating with ATC during the stall, reporting descending. Inside the cockpit, as the time passed, stress increased, and eventually the crew was very distressed by the situation, especially in the final moment before the crash.

There were no other communications. The crash was witnessed by a local farmer and a young couple seeking shelter from the rain. They told reporters that they saw the aircraft falling out of the sky and that it burst into flames upon hitting the ground. They could see people in a number of seats that were thrown out of the aircraft on impact, but none showed any signs of life.

A Ukrainian teenager managed to record a video of the crash on their cellphone. The video of the crash was uploaded to YouTube one day after the accident.

Investigation 

Approximately 260 rescue personnel arrived at the scene, which was blocked off by the authorities. On Wednesday, Ukrainian emergency service personnel concluded their search for bodies, confirming that all 170 people on board had perished. Because of the extensive crash forces and post-accident fires, rescuers believed that it would be very difficult to identify the majority of the victims at the site. The aircraft belly-flopped into a swampy area and disintegrated on impact. The search for the black boxes, which was interrupted for the night, concluded the following morning, when both recorders were found and subsequently transported to Moscow for analysis.

The Interstate Aviation Committee (IAC or MAK), after initial decoding of the flight recorder data, issued flight safety recommendations advising to avoid entering thunderstorms, to follow all maximum height limitations based on aircraft load and outside air temperature and to improve pilot training when working in these situations.

The MAK final report concluded:The cause of the crash was the aircraft being flown in manual flight mode with excessive angles of attack causing a stall with a subsequent transition to a flat spin and collision with the ground at high vertical speed. The flight manual and crew training programs did not provide instruction on manual pitch control and pitch trim during high-altitude flight. The lack of appropriate simulators contributed to the crew’s lack of ability. While avoiding areas of thunderstorms and turbulence, the crew allowed the aircraft to enter pitch oscillations exceeding the angle of attack operational range. Lack of control over speed and not following the Flight Manual to prevent and recover from a stall and poor crew resource management allowed the situation to escalate into a catastrophic one.

Victims
There were 160 passengers and 10 crew members aboard the aircraft. Among the passengers, 115 were adults and 45 were children under 12 years old. Among the adults, eight were over 60 (including a 92-year-old woman who flew with her grandson, his wife and two great-grandchildren). Earlier reports by the media and by the airline indicated that 159 passengers were on the flight, 39 children under 12 and six infants under two years of age. Some other sources reported that the plane was carrying 171 people. Authorities could not explain this apparent discrepancy with the numbers and asked the public to wait for expert analysis to be completed.

The Russian Ministry of Emergency Situations published a list of passengers travelling on Flight 612. Of 159 people, 20 were travelling to Norilsk through Saint Petersburg, and three to Murmansk. Most of the passengers were families travelling back from vacations with children.

Five passengers had multiple citizenship in addition to Russian (one from the Netherlands, two from Germany, one from France and one from Finland).

Ukraine held a national day of mourning for the people killed in the crash on Wednesday, August 23, and shifted celebration of its 15th Independence Day from August 24 to August 26. Russia held a national day of mourning on Thursday, August 24, 2006.

See also

Accidents of a similar nature include:
 Aeroflot Flight 7425
Indonesia AirAsia Flight 8501 
West Caribbean Airways Flight 708
Air France Flight 447

References

External links

 "Ту-154 RA-85185 22.08.2006." (Investigation, Archive).  Interstate Aviation Committee. (PDF, Archive)
ОФИЦИАЛЬНОЕ ЗАЯВЛЕНИЕ ФГУАП «ПУЛКОВО» ИНФОРМАЦИЯ О РЕЙСЕ АНАПА - САНКТ-ПЕТЕРБУРГ —Pulkovo Aviation (Archive)
 170 die as Russian plane is struck by lightning

 Cockpit Voice Recorder transcript and accident summary

Airliner accidents and incidents caused by pilot error
Aviation accidents and incidents in 2006
Aviation accidents and incidents in Ukraine
Accidents and incidents involving the Tupolev Tu-154
2006 in Ukraine
History of Donetsk Oblast
August 2006 events in Europe
Airliner accidents and incidents caused by stalls